The Galeno mine is a large copper mine located in the north of Peru in Loreto Region. Galeno represents one of the largest copper reserve in Peru and in the world having estimated reserves of 716 million tonnes of ore grading 0.5% copper, 0.013% molybdenum, 2.75 million oz of gold and 57.5 million oz of silver.

See also 
List of mines in Peru

Zinc mining

References 

Copper mines in Peru